Norman Blake and Red Rector is an album of American guitarist Norman Blake and mandolin player Red Rector, released in 1976.

Track listing
 "Girl I Left Behind"
 "Denver Belle"
 "Lorena"
 "The Old Spinning Wheel"
 "Mississippi Sawyer"
 "Red Wing"
 "Cricket on the Hearth"
 "Limehouse Blues" 
 "The Green Leaves of Spring"
 "Freight Train"
 " Darling Nellie Across the Sea"	 	 
 "Darlin' Honey"

1976 albums
Norman Blake (American musician) albums